Miss International 1975, the 15th Miss International pageant, was held on November 3, 1975 at the Okinawa's Expo Portside Theater in Motobu, Japan. 48 contestants competed for the pageant. Finally, Lidija Manić from Yugoslavia crown as Miss International 1975 by outgoing titleholder, Brucene Smith from USA.

Results

Placements

Contestants

  - Graciela Silvia Massanes Marne
  - Alison Leigh McKean
  - Rosemary Holzschuh
  - Liliane Marie Walschaers
  - Rosario Maria del Blanco
  - Lisane Guimarães Távora
  - Sharon Jermyn
  - Normande Jacques
  - Ana Maria Papic Marinovic
  - Alina Maria Botero López
  - Maria Lidieth Mora Badilla
  - Lone Degn Olsen
  - Eeva Kristiina Mannerberg
  - Isabelle Nadia Krumacker
  - Sigrid Silke Klose
  - Maria Tzobanaki
  - Clarissa Perez Duenas
  - Sandra A. Silva
  - Nannetje Johanna Nielen
  - Ligia Yolanda Caballero Cárdenas
  - Conny Kwan Suk-Fun
  - Thorbjorg Gardarsdóttir
  - Indira Maria Bredemeyer
  - Yayuk Rahayu Sosiawati
  - Nuala Holloway
  - Silvana Coppa
  - Sumiko Kumagai
  - Lee Hyang-mok
  - Ramona Karam
  - Martine Anne Wagner
  - Jenny Tan
  - Mary Louis Elull
  - Margarita Vernis
  - Miranda Grace Hilton
  - Myra Barquero Robleto
  - Jaye Antonio Murphy
  - Gladys Salgado Castillo
  - Jenny Tan Gwek Eng
  - Maria Teresa Maldonado Valle
  - Salangshaala Jerrie Ahlip
  - Kerstin Anita Olsson
  - Isabelle Cathrine Michel
  - Moea Marie-Therese Amiot
  - Nur Fedakar
  - Stella Barrios
  - Patricia Lynn Bailey
  - Maria del Carmen Yamel Díaz Rodríguez
  - Lidija Vera Manic

Other Notes
  - Lidija Vera Manic - was also competed at Miss Universe in 1975. She  was unplaced in El Salvador but was won by Anne Marie Pohtamo. Months later she went competed in Japan then she won the crown. Becaming the first and only Yugoslavian woman to win Miss International.

References

External links
 Pageantopolis - Miss International 1975

1975
1975 beauty pageants
Beauty pageants in Japan
1975 in Japan